The 2004 Maine Democratic presidential caucuses took place on February 8, 2004 as part of the 2004 United States Democratic presidential primaries. The delegate allocation is Proportional. the candidates are awarded delegates in proportion to the percentage of votes received and is open to registered Democrats only. A total of 24 (of 34) delegates are awarded proportionally.

See also
 2004 Democratic Party presidential primaries

References

2004 Maine elections
Maine
2004